Shrunken Heads may refer to:

 Shrunken Heads (film), a 1994 film directed by Richard Elfman
 Shrunken Heads (album), a 2007 album by Ian Hunter